Zuyevka is the name of several inhabited localities in Russia.

Urban localities
Zuyevka, Kirov Oblast, a town in Zuyevsky District of Kirov Oblast

Rural localities
Zuyevka, Republic of Bashkortostan, a village in Urgushevsky Selsoviet of Karaidelsky District of the Republic of Bashkortostan
Zuyevka, Chelyabinsk Oblast, a village in Borovoy Selsoviet of Oktyabrsky District of Chelyabinsk Oblast
Zuyevka, Kaliningrad Oblast, a settlement in Zalesovsky Rural Okrug of Polessky District of Kaliningrad Oblast
Zuyevka, Kursk Oblast, a selo in Zuyevsky Selsoviet of Solntsevsky District of Kursk Oblast
Zuyevka, Oryol Oblast, a village in Uzkinsky Selsoviet of Znamensky District of Oryol Oblast
Zuyevka, Dedovichsky District, Pskov Oblast, a village in Dedovichsky District, Pskov Oblast
Zuyevka, Sebezhsky District, Pskov Oblast, a village in Sebezhsky District, Pskov Oblast
Zuyevka, Samara Oblast, a selo in Neftegorsky District of Samara Oblast